Phulbani Lok Sabha constituency was a Lok Sabha parliamentary constituency in Orissa state in eastern India till 2008.

Assembly segments
Assembly segments which constituted this parliamentary constituency were Bhanjanagar, Balliguda, Udaygiri, Phulbani, Boudh, Sonepur and Binka.

Members of Parliament
Eleven elections were held between 1962 and 2004. Elected members from the Phulbani constituency are:
2004: Sugrib Singh, Biju Janata Dal
1999: Padmanava Behara, (BJD)
1998: Padmanava Behara, (BJD)
1996: Mrutyunjaya Nayak, Indian National Congress
1991: Mrutyunjaya Nayak, (Congress)
1989: Nakul Nayak, Janata Dal
1984: Radha Kanta Digal, (Congress)
1980: Mrutyunjaya Nayak, (Congress)
1977: Sribatcha Digal, Janata Party
1971: Baksi Nayak, Swatantra Party
1967: Anirudha Dipa, (Swatantra Party)
1962: Rajendra Kohar, Ganatantra Parishad (later Swatantra Party)
1957: Bijaya Chandra Pradhan (Ganatantra Parishad )
1952: T. Sanganna,  Nikhil Utkal Adibasi Congress (as Rayagada-Phulbani seat)

See also
 Kandhamal district
 List of former constituencies of the Lok Sabha

References

Former Lok Sabha constituencies of Odisha
Former constituencies of the Lok Sabha
2008 disestablishments in India
Constituencies disestablished in 2008
Kandhamal district
Boudh district
Ganjam district